Maarten Evert Reinoud Gerard Nicolaas Jansen (born 4 October 1952 in Zeist) is a Dutch academic and professor of Mesoamerican archaeology and history. As of 2007 Jansen holds the position of Dean of the Faculty of Archaeology at Leiden University, Netherlands. Jansen is an internationally renowned figure in pre-Columbian Mesoamerican studies, whose particular field of expertise concerns the culture, history and manuscripts of the Mixtec civilization from the Oaxacan region of central-southern Mexico.

Notes

References

External links
 
 Jansen's faculty page at Leiden University

1952 births
Living people
20th-century Dutch archaeologists
Dutch Mesoamericanists
Mixtec scholars
Leiden University alumni
Academic staff of Leiden University
People from Zeist
20th-century Mesoamericanists
21st-century Mesoamericanists
21st-century Dutch archaeologists